Operation Eagle Assist was a NATO operation where AWACS aircraft patrolled the skies over the United States following the September 11 attacks.

On October 4, about a month after the September 11 attacks, the North Atlantic Council decided to operationalize Article 5 of the North Atlantic Treaty. The operation began on October 9, 2001. It was NATO's first deployment "in the defense of one of its member countries". In total, 830 crew members from 13 NATO nations executed 360 operational sorties, totaling nearly 4300 hours.

The operation ended on May 16, 2002. The decision to terminate "was made on the basis of upgrades to the U.S. air defense posture, enhanced cooperation between U.S. civil and military authorities, and on mandatory evaluations of homeland security requirements."

See also
 List of Canadian military operations
 Operation Noble Eagle

References

External links
 Statement by the Secretary General on the conclusion of Operation Eagle Assist
 Canadian Forces contributions to NATO
 Article 5 North Atlantic Treaty Organisation (NATO) Medal for Operation "Eagle Assist" Order
 

Military operations involving NATO
2001 in the United States
2002 in the United States